John C. Brodie (died 1901) was a Scottish professional footballer who played as an inside forward. Born in Kilmarnock, he was playing for his hometown club when he was signed by Football League side Burnley in November 1890. Brodie made his debut for the club in the 0–7 defeat away at Preston North End on 2 February 1891, in place of the regular right-inside forward Alexander McLardie. He was also selected for the following match, a 0–4 loss to Notts County, but did not appear again for Burnley and returned to Kilmarnock in March 1891.

Brodie then had a spell at Third Lanark, before moving back to England with Nottingham Forest where he scored five goals in nine league appearances. In 1894, he returned to Kilmarnock for a fourth spell, before ending his career with amateur side Kilmarnock Athletic.

References

Year of birth missing
1901 deaths
Footballers from Kilmarnock
Scottish footballers
Association football forwards
Kilmarnock F.C. players
Burnley F.C. players
Third Lanark A.C. players
Nottingham Forest F.C. players
English Football League players
Scottish Football League players